Ehatisaht, also known as Ehatisaht Village and Ahateset, is a former First Nations village of the Nuu-chah-nulth people on northern Vancouver Island on the north shore of Esperanza Inlet. The native language is Nuučaan̓uɫ.

See also
Ehattesaht First Nation

References

Northern Vancouver Island
Settlements in British Columbia
Nuu-chah-nulth